Iraj Hatam (is a former Iranian football player. He played for Iran national football team in 1958 Asian Games.

Club career
He previously played for the Nirooye Havaei and Taj.

References

External links

 Iraj Hatam at TeamMelli.com

Iranian footballers
Esteghlal F.C. players
Living people
Association football midfielders
Year of birth missing (living people)
Iran international footballers